USS Narcissus may refer to the following ships of the United States Navy:

 , a screw steamer which served in the Union, during the American Civil War.
 , a U.S. Coast Guard ship that was transferred to the U.S. Navy; served as a large inland buoy tender until the end of World War II; returned to the Coast Guard.

United States Navy ship names